Baroka F.C. is a South African football club from Ga-Mphahlele near Polokwane, Limpopo that plays in the National First Division also known as the Motsepe Foundation Championship for sponsorship reasons, following their relegation from the top tier division commonly referred to as DStv Premiership.

The club rose to prominence in 2011 by reaching the semi-final of the 2010–11 Nedbank Cup, defeating several Premier Soccer League sides like Moroka Swallows and Kaizer Chiefs along the way. They also won the 2010–11 Vodacom League Limpopo division, but subsequently fell short at the playoff stage, to win the aspired promotion for National First Division. In their debut season in the National First Division they came close to gaining promotion play-offs to the Premier Soccer League but fell short on goal difference on the last day with a 1–1 draw against Thanda Royal Zulu.

Achievements
 2018 Telkom Knockout Champions 
2015–16 National First Division champions.
 2010–11 Nedbank Cup semi-finalists
 Vodacom League 2010–11 Limpopo champions.

Club officials/Technical team
 Coach:  Matsimela Thoka

Current squad

References

External links
 

 
Soccer clubs in South Africa
Association football clubs established in 2007
2007 establishments in South Africa
Polokwane